Old Church Slavonic or Old Slavonic was the first Slavic literary language.

Historians credit the 9th-century Byzantine missionaries Saints Cyril and Methodius with standardizing the language and using it in translating the Bible and other Ancient Greek ecclesiastical texts as part of the Christianization of the Slavs.  It is thought to have been based primarily on the dialect of the 9th-century Byzantine Slavs living in the Province of Thessalonica (in present-day Greece).

Old Church Slavonic played an important role in the history of the Slavic languages and served as a basis and model for later Church Slavonic traditions, and some Eastern Orthodox and Eastern Catholic churches use this later Church Slavonic as a liturgical language to this day.

As the oldest attested Slavic language, OCS provides important evidence for the features of Proto-Slavic, the reconstructed common ancestor of all Slavic languages.

Nomenclature
The name of the language in Old Church Slavonic texts was simply Slavic (словѣ́ньскъ ѩꙁꙑ́къ, slověnĭskŭ językŭ), derived from the word for Slavs (словѣ́нє, slověne), the self-designation of the compilers of the texts. This name is preserved in the modern native names of the Slovak and Slovene languages. The language is sometimes called Old Slavic, which may be confused with the distinct Proto-Slavic language. Different strains of nationalists have tried to 'claim' Old Church Slavonic; thus OCS has also been variously called Old Bulgarian, Old Croatian, Old Macedonian or Old Serbian, or even Old Slovak, Old Slovenian. The commonly accepted terms in modern English-language Slavic studies are Old Church Slavonic and Old Church Slavic.

The term Old Bulgarian is the only designation used by Bulgarian-language writers. It was used in numerous 19th-century sources, e.g. by August Schleicher, Martin Hattala, Leopold Geitler and August Leskien, who noted similarities between the first literary Slavic works and the modern Bulgarian language. For similar reasons, Russian linguist Aleksandr Vostokov used the term Slav-Bulgarian. The term is still used by some writers but nowadays normally avoided in favor of Old Church Slavonic.

The term Old Macedonian is occasionally used by Western scholars in a regional context.

The obsolete term Old Slovenian was used by early 19th-century scholars who conjectured that the language was based on the dialect of Pannonia.

History
Byzantine missionaries standardized the language for the expedition of the two apostles, Cyril and his brother Methodius, to Great Moravia (the territory of today's Czechia and western Slovakia; see Glagolitic alphabet for details). For that purpose, Cyril and Methodius started to translate religious literature into Old Church Slavonic, allegedly basing the language on the Slavic dialects spoken in the hinterland of their hometown, Thessaloniki, in present-day Greece.

As part of preparations for the mission, in 862/863, the Glagolitic alphabet was developed and the most important prayers and liturgical books, including the Aprakos Evangeliar (a Gospel Book lectionary containing only feast-day and Sunday readings), the Psalter, and the Acts of the Apostles, were translated. (The Gospels were also translated early, but it is unclear whether Cyril or Methodius had a hand in this.)

The language and the Glagolitic alphabet, as taught at the Great Moravian Academy, were used for government and religious documents and books between 863 and 885. The texts written during this phase contain characteristics of the West Slavic vernaculars in Great Moravia.

In 885 Pope Stephen V prohibited the use of Old Church Slavonic in Great Moravia in favour of Latin. King Svatopluk I of Great Moravia expelled the Byzantine missionary contingent in 886.

Exiled students of the two apostles, then brought the Glagolitic alphabet to the Bulgarian Empire. Boris I of Bulgaria received and officially accepted them; he established  the Preslav Literary School and the Ohrid Literary School.

Both schools originally used the Glagolitic alphabet, though the Cyrillic script developed early on at the Preslav Literary School, where it superseded Glagolitic as official in Bulgaria in 893.

The texts written during this era exhibit certain linguistic features of the vernaculars of the First Bulgarian Empire. Old Church Slavonic spread to other South-Eastern, Central, and Eastern European Slavic territories, most notably Croatia, Serbia, Bohemia, Lesser Poland, and principalities of the Kievan Rus' – while retaining characteristically Eastern South Slavic linguistic features.

Later texts written in each of those territories began to take on characteristics of the local Slavic vernaculars, and by the mid-11th century Old Church Slavonic had diversified into a number of regional varieties (known as recensions). These local varieties are collectively known as the Church Slavonic language.

Apart from use in the Slavic countries, Old Church Slavonic served as a liturgical language in the Romanian Orthodox Church, and also as a literary and official language of the princedoms of Wallachia and Moldavia (see Old Church Slavonic in Romania), before gradually being replaced by Romanian during the 16th to 17th centuries.

Church Slavonic maintained a prestigious status, particularly in Russia, for many centuriesamong Slavs in the East it had a status analogous to that of Latin in Western Europe, but had the advantage of being substantially less divergent from the vernacular tongues of average parishioners.

Some Orthodox churches, such as the Bulgarian Orthodox Church, Russian Orthodox Church, Serbian Orthodox Church, Ukrainian Orthodox Church and Macedonian Orthodox Church – Ohrid Archbishopric, as well as several Eastern Catholic Churches, still use Church Slavonic in their services and chants as of 2021.

Script
Initially Old Church Slavonic was written with the Glagolitic alphabet, but later Glagolitic was replaced by Cyrillic, which was developed in the First Bulgarian Empire by a decree of Boris I of Bulgaria in the 9th century.

The local Bosnian Cyrillic alphabet, known as Bosančica,  was preserved in Bosnia and parts of Croatia, while a variant of the angular Glagolitic alphabet was preserved in Croatia. See Early Cyrillic alphabet for a detailed description of the script and information about the sounds it originally expressed.

Phonology
For Old Church Slavonic, the following segments are reconstructible. A few sounds are given in Slavic transliterated form rather than in IPA, as the exact realisation is uncertain and often differs depending on the area that a text originated from.

Consonants
For English equivalents and narrow transcriptions of sounds, see Old Church Slavonic Pronunciation on Wiktionary.

  These phonemes were realized as different sounds in different dialects, but were written as <щ> and <жд> in all regions except for the region of Serbia where <ꙉ> was used to denote both sounds instead. In Bulgaria, <щ> represented the sequence , and it is normally transliterated as št for that reason. Farther west and north, it was probably  or  like in modern Macedonian, Torlakian, and Serbian/Croatian.
   appears mostly in early texts, becoming  later on.
When it is, it is shown by a palatization diacritic over the letter: ⟨ л҄ ⟩ ⟨ н҄ ⟩ ⟨ р҄ ⟩.

Vowels
For English equivalents and narrow transcriptions of sounds, see Old Church Slavonic Pronunciation on Wiktionary.

 Accent is not indicated in writing and must be inferred from later languages and from reconstructions of Proto-Slavic.
  All front vowels were iotified word-initially and succeeding other vowels. The same sometimes applied for *a and *ǫ.  In the Bulgarian region, an epinthetic *v was inserted before *ǫ in the place of iotification.
  The distinction between /i/, /ji/ and /jɪ/ is rarely indicated in writing and must be inferred from reconstructions of Proto-Slavic. In Glagolitic, the three are written as <ⰻ>,  <ⰹ>, and <ⰺ> respectively. In Cyrillic, /jɪ/ may sometimes be written as ı, and /ji/ as ї, although this is rarely the case.
  Yers preceding *j became tense, this was inconsistently reflected in writing in the case of *ь (ex: чаꙗньѥ or чаꙗние, both pronounced [t͡ʃɑjɑn̪ije]), but never with *ъ (which was always written as a yery). 
  Yery was the descendant of Proto-Blato-Slavic long *ū and was a high back unrounded vowel.  Tense *ъ merged with *y, which gave rise to yery's spelling as <ъи> (later <ꙑ>, modern <ы>).
  The yer vowels ь and ъ (ĭ and ŭ) are often called "ultrashort" and were lower, more centralised and shorter than their tense counterparts *i and *y. Both yers had a strong and a weak variant, with a yer always being strong if the next vowel is another yer. Weak yers disappeared in most positions in the word, already sporadically in the earliest texts but more frequently later on. Strong yers, on the other hand, merged with other vowels, particularly ĭ with e and ŭ with o, but differently in different areas. 
  The pronunciation of yat (ѣ/ě) differed by area.
  *a was the descendant of Proto-Slavic long *o and was a low back unrounded vowel. Its iotified variant was often confused with *ě (in Glagolitic they are even the same letter: Ⱑ), so *a was probably fronted to *ě when it followed palatal consonants (this is still the case in Rhodopean dialects).
  The exact articulation of the nasal vowels is unclear because different areas tend to merge them with different vowels. ę /ɛ̃/ is occasionally seen to merge with e or ě in South Slavic, but becomes ja early on in East Slavic. ǫ /ɔ̃/ generally merges with u or o, but in Bulgaria, ǫ was apparently unrounded and eventually merged with ъ.

Phonotactics
Several notable constraints on the distribution of the phonemes can be identified, mostly resulting from the tendencies occurring within the Common Slavic period, such as intrasyllabic synharmony and the law of open syllables. For consonant and vowel clusters and sequences of a consonant and a vowel, the following constraints can be ascertained:
 Two adjacent consonants tend not to share identical features of manner of articulation
 No syllable ends in a consonant
 Every obstruent agrees in voicing with the following obstruent
 Velars do not occur before front vowels
 Phonetically palatalized consonants do not occur before certain back vowels
 The back vowels /y/ and /ъ/ as well as front vowels other than /i/ do not occur word-initially: the two back vowels take prothetic /v/ and the front vowels prothetic /j/. Initial /a/ may take either prothetic consonant or none at all.
 Vowel sequences are attested in only one lexeme (paǫčina 'spider's web') and in the suffixes /aa/ and /ěa/ of the imperfect
 At morpheme boundaries, the following vowel sequences occur: /ai/, /au/, /ao/, /oi/, /ou/, /oo/, /ěi/, /ěo/

Morphophonemic alternations
As a result of the first and the second Slavic palatalizations, velars alternate with dentals and palatals. In addition, as a result of a process usually termed iotation (or iodization), velars and dentals alternate with palatals in various inflected forms and in word formation.

In some forms the alternations of /c/ with /č/ and of /dz/ with /ž/ occur, in which the corresponding velar is missing. The dental alternants of velars occur regularly before /ě/ and /i/ in the declension and in the imperative, and somewhat less regularly in various forms after /i/, /ę/, /ь/ and /rь/. The palatal alternants of velars occur before front vowels in all other environments, where dental alternants do not occur, as well as in various places in inflection and word formation described below.

As a result of earlier alternations between short and long vowels in roots in Proto-Indo-European, Proto-Balto-Slavic and Proto-Slavic times, and of the fronting of vowels after palatalized consonants, the following vowel alternations are attested in OCS: /ь/ : /i/;   /ъ/ : /y/ : /u/;   /e/ : /ě/ : /i/;   /o/ : /a/;   /o/ : /e/;   /ě/ : /a/;   /ъ/ : /ь/;   /y/ : /i/;   /ě/ : /i/;   /y/ : /ę/.

Vowel:∅ alternations sometimes occurred as a result of sporadic loss of weak yer, which later occurred in almost all Slavic dialects. The phonetic value of the corresponding vocalized strong jer is dialect-specific.

Grammar

As an ancient Indo-European language, OCS has a highly inflective morphology. Inflected forms are divided in two groups, nominals and verbs. Nominals are further divided into nouns, adjectives and pronouns. Numerals inflect either as nouns or pronouns, with 1–4 showing gender agreement as well.

Nominals can be declined in three grammatical genders (masculine, feminine, neuter), three numbers (singular, plural, dual) and seven cases: nominative, vocative, accusative, instrumental, dative, genitive, and locative. There are five basic inflectional classes for nouns: o/jo-stems, a/ja-stems, i-stems, u-stems and consonant stems. Forms throughout the inflectional paradigm usually exhibit morphophonemic alternations.

Fronting of vowels after palatals and j yielded dual inflectional class o : jo and a : ja, whereas palatalizations affected stem as a synchronic process (N sg. vlьkъ, V sg. vlьče; L sg. vlьcě). Productive classes are o/jo-, a/ja- and i-stems. Sample paradigms are given in the table below:

Adjectives are inflected as o/jo-stems (masculine and neuter) and a/ja-stems (feminine), in three genders. They could have short (indefinite) or long (definite) variants, the latter being formed by suffixing to the indefinite form the anaphoric third-person pronoun jь.

Synthetic verbal conjugation is expressed in present, aorist and imperfect tenses while perfect, pluperfect, future and conditional tenses/moods are made by combining auxiliary verbs with participles or synthetic tense forms. Sample conjugation for the verb vesti "to lead" (underlyingly ved-ti) is given in the table below.

Basis and local influences

Written evidence of Old Church Slavonic survives in a relatively small body of manuscripts, most of them written in the First Bulgarian Empire during the late 10th and the early 11th centuries. The language has a South Slavic basis with an admixture of Western Slavic features inherited during the mission of Saints Cyril and Methodius to Great Moravia (863–885).

The only well-preserved manuscript of the Moravian recension, the Kiev Folia, is characterised by the replacement of some South Slavic phonetic and lexical features with Western Slavic ones. Manuscripts written in the Second Bulgarian Empire (1185–1396) have, on the other hand, few Western Slavic features.

Old Church Slavonic is valuable to historical linguists since it preserves archaic features believed to have once been common to all Slavic languages such as these:
 Most significantly, the yer (extra-short) vowels:  and 
 Nasal vowels:  and 
 Near-open articulation of the yat vowel
 Proto-Slavic declension system based on stem endings, including those that later disappeared in attested languages (such as u-stems)
 Dual as a distinct grammatical number from singular and plural
 Aorist, imperfect, Proto-Slavic paradigms for participles

Old Church Slavonic is also likely to have preserved an extremely archaic type of accentuation (probably close to the Chakavian dialect of modern Serbo-Croatian), but unfortunately, no accent marks appear in the written manuscripts.

The South Slavic nature of the language is evident from the following variations:

 Phonetic:
 ra, la by means of liquid metathesis of Proto-Slavic *or, *ol clusters
 sě from Proto-Slavic *xě < *xai
 cv, (d)zv from Proto-Slavic *kvě, *gvě < *kvai, *gvai
morphosyntactic use of the dative possessive case in personal pronouns and nouns: 'рѫка ти' (rǫka ti, "your hand"), 'отъпоущенье грѣхомъ' (otŭpuštenĭje grěxomŭ, "remission of sins"); periphrastic future tense using the verb 'хотѣти' (xotěti, "to want"); use of the comparative form 'мьнии' (mĭniji, "smaller") to denote "younger".
morphosyntactic use of suffixed demonstrative pronouns 'тъ, та, то' (tŭ, ta, to). In Bulgarian and Macedonian these developed into suffixed definite articles.

Old Church Slavonic has some extra features in common with Bulgarian:
 Near-open articulation  of the Yat vowel (ě); still preserved in the Bulgarian dialects of the Rhodope mountains;
 Use of possessive dative for personal pronouns and nouns, as in 'братъ ми' (bratŭ mi, "my brother"), 'рѫка ти' (rǫka ti, "your hand"), 'отъпоущенье грѣхомъ' (otŭpuštenĭje grěxomŭ, "remission of sins"), 'храмъ молитвѣ' (xramŭ molitvě, 'house of prayer'), etc.
 Periphrastic compound future tense formed with the auxiliary verb 'хотѣти' (xotěti, "to want"), for example 'хоштѫ писати' (xoštǫ pisati, "I will write").

Great Moravia

The language was standardized for the first time by the mission of the two apostles to Great Moravia from 863. The manuscripts of the Moravian recension are therefore the earliest dated of the OCS recensions. The recension takes its name from the Slavic state of Great Moravia which existed in Central Europe during the 9th century on the territory of today's eastern Czechia, northern Austria and western Slovakia.

Moravian recension
This recension is exemplified by the Kiev Folia. Certain other linguistic characteristics include:
 Confusion between the letters Big yus (Ѫ) and Uk (оу) – this occurs once in the Kiev Folia, when the expected form въсоудъ vъsudъ is spelled въсѫдъ vъsǫdъ
 Use of the words mьša, cirky, papežь, prěfacija, klepati, piskati etc.
 Preservation of the consonant cluster  (e.g. modlitvami)
 Use of the ending –ъmь instead of –omь in the masculine singular instrumental, use of the pronoun čьso

First Bulgarian Empire

Old Church Slavonic language is developed in the First Bulgarian Empire and was taught in Preslav (Bulgarian capital between 893 and 972), and in Ohrid (Bulgarian capital between 991/997 and 1015). It did not represent one regional dialect but a generalized form of early eastern South Slavic, which cannot be localized. The existence of two major literary centres in the Empire led in the period from the 9th to the 11th centuries to the emergence of two recensions (otherwise called "redactions"), termed "Eastern" and "Western" respectively. Some researchers do not differentiate between manuscripts of the two recensions, preferring to group them together in a "Macedo-Bulgarian" or simply "Bulgarian" recension. Others, as Horace Lunt, have changed their opinion with time. In the mid-1970s, Lunt held that the differences in the initial OCS were neither great enough nor consistent enough to grant a distinction between a 'Macedonian' recension and a 'Bulgarian' one. A decade later, however, Lunt argued in favour of such a distinction, illustrating his point with paleographic, phonological and other differences. The development of Old Church Slavonic literacy had the effect of preventing the assimilation of the South Slavs into neighboring cultures, which promoted the formation of a distinct Bulgarian identity.

Preslav recension
The manuscripts of the Preslav recension or "Eastern" variant are among the oldest of the Old Church Slavonic language. This recension was centred around the Preslav Literary School. Since the earliest datable Cyrillic inscriptions were found in the area of Preslav, it is this school which is credited with the development of the Cyrillic alphabet which gradually replaced the Glagolitic one. A number of prominent Bulgarian writers and scholars worked at the Preslav Literary School, including Naum of Preslav (until 893), Constantine of Preslav, John Exarch, Chernorizets Hrabar, etc. The main linguistic features of this recension are the following:

 The Glagolitic and Cyrillic alphabets were used concurrently.
 In some documents the original supershort vowels ъ and ь merged with one letter taking the place of the other.
 The central vowel ы (ꙑ) y merged with ъи ъi.
 The verb forms нарицаѭ, нарицаѥши (naricajǫ, naricaješi) were substituted or alternated with наричꙗѭ, наричꙗеши (naričjajǫ, naričjaješi).

Ohrid recension
The manuscripts of the Ohrid recension or "Western" variant are among the oldest of the Old Church Slavonic language. The recension is sometimes named Macedonian because its literary centre, Ohrid, lies in the historical region of Macedonia. At that period, Ohrid administratively formed part of the province of Kutmichevitsa in the First Bulgarian Empire until the Byzantine conquest.  The main literary centre of this dialect was the Ohrid Literary School, whose most prominent member and most likely founder, was Saint Clement of Ohrid who was commissioned by Boris I of Bulgaria to teach and instruct the future clergy of the state in the Slavonic language. The language variety that was used in the area started shaping the modern Macedonian dialects. This recension is represented by the Codex Zographensis and Marianus, among others. The main linguistic features of this recension include:

 Continuous usage of the Glagolitic alphabet instead of Cyrillic
 Strict distinction in the articulation of the yers and their vocalisation in strong position (ъ >  and ь > ) or deletion in weak position
 Denasalization in the latter stages:  >  and  > , оу, ъ
 Wider usage and retention of the phoneme  (which in most other Slavic languages has dеaffricated to );

Czech recension 
Czech (Bohemian) recension is derived from Moravian recension and had been used in the Czech lands until 1097. It's preserved in religious texts (e.g. Prague Fragments), legends and glosses. Its main features are:
 PSl. *tj, *kt(i), *dj, *gt(i) → c /ts/, z: pomocь, utvrьzenie
 PSl. *stj, *skj → šč: *očistjenьje → očiščenie
 ending -ъmь in instr. sg. (instead of -omь): obrazъmь
 verbs with prefix vy- (instead of iz-)
 promoting of etymological -dl-, -tl- (světidlъna, vъsedli, inconsistently)
 suppressing of epenthetic l (prěstavenie, inconsistently)
 -š- in original stem vьx- (všěx) after 3rd palatalization
 development of yers and nasals coincident with development in Czech lands
 fully syllabic r and l 
 ending -my in first-person pl. verbs
 missing terminal -tь in third-person present tense indicative
 creating future tense using prefix po-
 using words prosba (request), zagrada (garden), požadati (to ask for), potrěbovati (to need), conjunctions aby, nebo etc.

Later recensions

Later use of the language in a number of medieval Slavic polities resulted in the adjustment of Old Church Slavonic to the local vernacular, though a number of South Slavic, Moravian or Bulgarian features also survived. Significant later recensions of Old Church Slavonic (referred to as Church Slavonic) in the present time include: Slovene, Croatian, Serbian and Russian. In all cases, denasalization of the yuses occurred; so that only Old Church Slavonic, modern Polish and some isolated Bulgarian dialects retained the old Slavonic nasal vowels.

Serbian recension
The Serbian recension was written mostly in Cyrillic, but also in the Glagolitic alphabet (depending on region); by the 12th century the Serbs used exclusively the Cyrillic alphabet (and Latin script in coastal areas). The 1186 Miroslav Gospels belong to the Serbian recension. They feature the following linguistic characteristics:

 Nasal vowels were denasalised and in one case closed: *ę > e, *ǫ > u, e.g. OCS rǫka > Sr. ruka ("hand"), OCS językъ > Sr. jezik ("tongue, language")
 Extensive use of diacritical signs by the Resava dialect
 Use of letters i, y for the sound  in other manuscripts of the Serbian recension

Due to the Ottoman conquest of Bulgaria in 1396, Serbia saw an influx of educated scribes and clergy who re-introduced a more classical form, closer resembling the Bulgarian recension.
The letter Ꙉ was also created, in place of the sounds *d͡ʑ, *tɕ, *dʑ and d͡ʒ,also used during the Bosnian recession.

Russian recension
The Russian recension emerged after the 10th century on the basis of the earlier Bulgarian recension, from which it differed slightly. Its main features are:
 Merging of letters ę and ja

Middle Bulgarian
The line between OCS and post-OCS manuscripts is arbitrary, and terminology varies. The common term "Middle Bulgarian" is usually contrasted to "Old Bulgarian" (an alternative name for Old Church Slavonic), and loosely used for manuscripts whose language demonstrates a broad spectrum of regional and temporal dialect features after the 11th century.

Bosnian recension
The Bosnian recension used the Bosnian Cyrillic alphabet (better known as Bosančica) and the Glagolitic alphabet.
 Use of letters i, y, ě for the sound  in Bosnian manuscripts. The letter Щ was used in place of the sounds *tɕ *ʃt and *ɕ

Croatian recension
The Croatian recension of Old Church Slavonic used only the Glagolitic alphabet of angular Croatian type. It shows the development of the following characteristics:

 Denasalisation of PSl. *ę > e, PSl. *ǫ > u, e.g. Cr. ruka : OCS rǫka ("hand"), Cr. jezik : OCS językъ ("tongue, language")
 PSl. *y > i, e.g. Cr. biti : OCS byti ("to be")
 PSl. weak-positioned yers *ъ and *ь in merged, probably representing some schwa-like sound, and only one of the letters was used (usually 'ъ'). Evident in earliest documents like Baška tablet.
 PSl. strong-positioned yers *ъ and *ь were vocalized into a in most Štokavian and Čakavian speeches, e.g. Cr. pas : OCS pьsъ ("dog")
 PSl. hard and soft syllabic liquids *r and r′ retained syllabicity and were written as simply r, as opposed to OCS sequences of mostly rь and rъ, e.g. krstъ and trgъ as opposed to OCS krьstъ and trъgъ ("cross", "market")
 PSl. #vьC and #vъC > #uC, e.g. Cr. udova : OCS. vъdova ("widow")

Canon
The core corpus of Old Church Slavonic manuscripts is usually referred to as canon. Manuscripts must satisfy certain linguistic, chronological and cultural criteria to be incorporated into the canon: they must not significantly depart from the language and tradition of Saints Cyril and Methodius, usually known as the Cyrillo-Methodian tradition.

For example, the Freising Fragments, dating from the 10th century, show some linguistic and cultural traits of Old Church Slavonic, but they are usually not included in the canon, as some of the phonological features of the writings appear to belong to certain Pannonian Slavic dialect of the period. Similarly, the Ostromir Gospels exhibits dialectal features that classify it as East Slavic, rather than South Slavic so it is not included in the canon either. On the other hand, the Kiev Missal is included in the canon even though it manifests some West Slavic features and contains Western liturgy because of the Bulgarian linguistic layer and connection to the Moravian mission.

Manuscripts are usually classified in two groups, depending on the alphabet used, Cyrillic or Glagolitic. With the exception of the Kiev Missal and Glagolita Clozianus, which exhibit West Slavic and Croatian features respectively, all Glagolitic texts are assumed to be of the Macedonian recension:

 Kiev Missal (Ki, KM), seven folios, late 10th century
 Codex Zographensis, (Zo), 288 folios, 10th or 11th century
 Codex Marianus (Mar), 173 folios, early 11th century
 Codex Assemanius (Ass), 158 folios, early 11th century
 Psalterium Sinaiticum (Pas, Ps. sin.), 177 folios, 11th century
 Euchologium Sinaiticum (Eu, Euch), 109 folios, 11th century
 Glagolita Clozianus (Clo, Cloz), 14 folios, 11th century
 Ohrid Folios (Ohr), 2 folios, 11th century
 Rila Folios (Ri, Ril), 2 folios and 5 fragments, 11th century

All Cyrillic manuscripts are of the Preslav recension (Preslav Literary School) and date from the 11th century except for the Zographos, which is of the Ohrid recension (Ohrid Literary School):

 Sava's book (Sa, Sav), 126 folios
 Codex Suprasliensis, (Supr), 284 folios
 Enina Apostle (En, Enin), 39 folios
 Hilandar Folios (Hds, Hil), 2 folios
 Undol'skij's Fragments (Und), 2 folios
 Macedonian Folio (Mac), 1 folio
 Zographos Fragments (Zogr. Fr.), 2 folios
 Sluck Psalter (Ps. Sl., Sl), 5 folios

Sample text
Here is the Lord's Prayer in Old Church Slavonic:

Authors
The history of Old Church Slavonic writing includes a northern tradition begun by the mission to Great Moravia, including a short mission in the Lower Pannonia, and a Bulgarian tradition begun by some of the missionaries who relocated to Bulgaria after the expulsion from Great Moravia.

Old Church Slavonic's first writings, translations of Christian liturgical and Biblical texts, were produced by Byzantine missionaries Saint Cyril and Saint Methodius, mostly during their mission to Great Moravia.

The most important authors in Old Church Slavonic after the death of Methodius and the dissolution of the Great Moravian academy were Clement of Ohrid (active also in Great Moravia), Constantine of Preslav, Chernorizetz Hrabar and John Exarch, all of whom worked in medieval Bulgaria at the end of the 9th and the beginning of the 10th century. The Second Book of Enoch was only preserved in Old Church Slavonic, although the original most certainly had been Greek or even Hebrew or Aramaic.

Modern Slavic nomenclature
Here are some of the names used by speakers of modern Slavic languages:
  (starasłavianskaja mova), 'Old Slavic language'
  (starobalgarski), 'Old Bulgarian' and старославянски, (staroslavyanski), 'Old Slavic'
 , 'Old Slavic'
  (staroslovenski), 'Old Slavic'
 , 'Old Church Slavic'
  (staroslavjánskij jazýk), 'Old Slavic language'
 , 'Old Slavic'
 , 'Old Church Slavic'
  (starotserkovnoslovjans'ka mova), 'Old Church Slavic language'

See also

 Outline of Slavic history and culture
 List of Slavic studies journals
 History of the Bulgarian language
 Church Slavonic language
 Old East Slavic
 List of Glagolitic manuscripts
 Proto-Slavic language
 Slavonic-Serbian

Notes

References

Bibliography

External links

 Old Church Slavonic Online by Todd B. Krause and Jonathan Slocum, free online lessons at the Linguistics Research Center at the University of Texas at Austin
 Medieval Slavic Fonts on AATSEEL
 Old Slavic data entry application
 Corpus Cyrillo-Methodianum Helsingiense: An Electronic Corpus of Old Church Slavonic Texts
 Research Guide to Old Church Slavonic
 Bible in Old Church Slavonic language – Russian redaction (Wikisource), (PDF) , (iPhone), (Android) 
 Old Church Slavonic and the Macedonian recension of the Church Slavonic language, Elka Ulchar 
 Vittore Pisani,  Old Bulgarian Language , Sofia, Bukvitza, 2012. English, Bulgarian, Italian.
 Philipp Ammon: Tractatus slavonicus. in: Sjani (Thoughts) Georgian Scientific Journal of Literary Theory and Comparative Literature, N 17, 2016, pp. 248–56

 glottothèque – Ancient Indo-European Grammars online, an online collection of introductory videos to Ancient Indo-European languages produced by the University of Göttingen

Languages attested from the 9th century
 
History of Eastern Orthodoxy
Extinct languages of Europe
Extinct Slavic languages
Great Moravia
History of Macedonia (region)
Christian liturgical languages
Medieval Bulgarian literature
Medieval languages
Medieval Macedonia
Medieval Serbia
Languages with own distinct writing systems